Alta is a town in eastern Salt Lake County, Utah, United States. It is part of the Salt Lake City, Utah Metropolitan Statistical Area. The population was 383 at the 2010 census, a slight increase from the 2000 figure of 370.

Alta is centered in the Alta Ski Area, a ski resort that has 500,000 annual visitors. It is known for its powder skiing and its decision to not allow snowboarding.

History

Alta has been important to the development of skiing in Utah. Alta was founded about 1865 to house miners from the Emma mine, the Flagstaff mine, and other silver mines in Little Cottonwood Canyon. Sensationally rich silver ore in the Emma mine enabled its owners to sell the mine at an inflated price to British investors in 1871. The subsequent exhaustion of the Emma ore body led to the recall of the American ambassador to Great Britain, who was a director of the company, and to Congressional hearings in Washington DC on the transaction.

An incident that occurred in the town in 1873 was adapted by Rod Serling for the episode entitled "Mr. Garrity and the Graves" of his television series The Twilight Zone.

An 1878 fire and an 1885 avalanche destroyed most of the original mining town, though some mining activity persisted into the 20th century. By the 1930s, only one resident, George Watson, remained in the town. Facing back taxes on mining claims that he owned, Watson donated much of his land in Alta to the U.S. Forest Service, stipulating that the land be used to construct a ski area.  In 1935, Norwegian skiing legend Alf Engen was hired to help develop the area, and Alta opened its first ski lift in 1938. By the end of the twentieth century, up to 7,000 people per day could be found on the Alta slopes, and traffic in the Little Cottonwood Canyon was nearing gridlock proportions.

Today, Alta is a small town centered around the Alta Ski Area.

During the COVID-19 pandemic and subsequent government-mandated economic restrictions, Alta briefly gained national attention when it was the only ski resort included in a detailed study of disease-transmission probabilities. The university-based study concluded that buses to the site could be made safe, traveling on ski lifts was safe, and queueing at ski lifts was safe. However, no amount of compensating factors could make indoor-dining at restaurants acceptably safe, and locker rooms could only be considered safe if occupants used "quiet voices".

Geography
According to the United States Census Bureau, the town has a total area of 4.1 square miles (10.5 km²), of which 4.1 square miles (10.5 km2) is land and 0.25% is water.

At , Alta is one of the highest cities in Utah and one of the highest in America.

Demographics

As of the 2010 United States Census, there were 386 people in 156 households in the town. The racial makeup of the town was 93 percent white and 4 percent Hispanic or Latino.

The population was 67 percent male and 33 percent female. The population was 4.7 percent under the age of 18, and 2.6 percent was 65 or older.

Climate
Alta experiences a high altitude humid continental climate (Köppen Dfb), which borders on a subalpine climate (Dfc), due to its high elevation. Alta's total precipitation of  during 1983 is a record for a calendar year in any state of the Mountain West;.

See also

 List of cities and towns in Utah
 Twister (tree) – located near Alta

References

External links

 
 Alta Visitors Bureau
 Alta History

Towns in Salt Lake County, Utah
Salt Lake City metropolitan area
Mining communities in Utah
Populated places established in 1865